The Legislative Assembly of Rio Grande do Sul is the unicameral legislature of Rio Grande do Sul state in Brazil. It has 55 state deputies elected by proportional representation.

The first legislature was on April 20, 1835, in the first day of the assembly, the deputy Bento Gonçalves is accused by the president of the province of articulating the separation of the Rio Grande, this marked the beginning of the Ragamuffin War. From September 20, 1835, to June 15, 1836, only the Farrapos attends in the assembly, the revolution also suspends the elections in 1837, the assembly is closed until the second legislature, that begins on March 1, 1846.

References

External links
Official website

Rio Grande do Sul
Rio Grande do Sul
Rio Grande do Sul